Prasophyllum castaneum, commonly known as the chestnut leek orchid, is a species of orchid endemic to Tasmania. It has a single tubular, dark green leaf with a dark purplish base and between ten and twenty chestnut coloured to dark brown flowers. In 2000, the entire population was estimated to be about fifty plants.

Description
Flowering occurs from late November to January.

Taxonomy and naming
Prasophyllum castaneum was first formally described in 1998 by David Jones from a specimen collected on Bruny Island and the description was published in Australian Orchid Research. The specific epithet (castaneum) is a Latin word meaning "of the colour of chestnuts", referring to the colour of the flowers.

Distribution and habitat
The chestnut leek orchid grows in moist heath under low shrubs in the South Bruny National Park and Tasman National Park.

Conservation
Prasophyllum castaneum is only known from two populations containing a total of fifty plants. The species is classified as Endangered under the Tasmanian Threatened Species Protection Act 1995 and as Critically Endangered under the Commonwealth Government Environment Protection and Biodiversity Conservation Act 1999 (EPBC) Act. Although both population are in national parks, one would be devastated by bushfire and the other is threatened by invasion of scrubby species in the absence of fire.

References

External links 
 

castaneum
Endemic flora of Tasmania
Endemic orchids of Australia
Plants described in 1998